
The Greek spelling alphabet is a spelling alphabet (or "phonetic alphabet") for Greek, i.e. an accepted set of easily differentiated names given to the letters of the alphabet for the purpose of spelling out words. It is used mostly on radio voice channels by the Greek army, the navy and the police. The names for some Greek letters are easily confused in noisy conditions.

Similar sounding Greek letters:

víta (β), zíta (ζ), íta (η), thíta (θ)
épsilon (ε), ýpsilon (υ)
mi (μ), ni (ν)
xi (ξ), pi (π), fi (φ), chi (χ), psi (ψ)

The spelling alphabet

See also
 NATO/ICAO phonetic alphabet, for the Roman alphabet
 Russian spelling alphabet

References

Further reading

 Efimeris tis kiverniseos tis Ellados (Greek National Gazette), 18 December 2002. (Specifies a phonetic alphabet recommended for use by the amateur radio service, although in practice it is never used.)

Spelling alphabets
Greek alphabet